Nicolai Grabmüller (born 18 April 1996) is an Austrian volleyball player, a member of the club SK Zadruga AICH/DOB.

Sporting achievements

Clubs 
MEVZA:
  2019
Austria Championship:
  2019

National Team 
European League:
  2016

References

External links
AICH-DOB profile
Volleyball-Bundesliga profile
ElteeVolley profile
Volleybox profile
WorldLeague.2017.FIVB profile
CEV profile

1996 births
Living people